Eric Schmitt (born 1975) is a U.S. Senator from Missouri.

Eric Schmitt may also refer to:

 Eric P. Schmitt (born 1959), American journalist
 Éric-Emmanuel Schmitt (born 1960), French writer

See also 
 Eric Smidt, American businessman, chairman and CEO of Harbor Freight Tools
 Eric Schmidt (disambiguation)
 Erich Schmidt (disambiguation)